Stacy McGee (born January 17, 1990) is an American football defensive end who is a free agent. He played college football at Oklahoma, and was drafted by the Oakland Raiders in the sixth round of the 2013 NFL Draft.

Professional career

Oakland Raiders
McGee was drafted by the Raiders in the sixth round, 205th overall, in the 2013 NFL Draft.

Washington Redskins
On March 10, 2017, McGee signed a five-year contract with the Washington Redskins.

McGee was placed on the physically unable to perform to start the 2018 season while recovering from core muscle surgery. He was activated off PUP on November 6, 2018.

On March 13, 2019, McGee was released by the Redskins.

Carolina Panthers
On November 26, 2019, McGee signed with the Carolina Panthers.

Arizona Cardinals
On November 24, 2020, McGee was signed to the Arizona Cardinals' practice squad. He was elevated to the active roster on November 28 and January 2, 2021, for the team's weeks 12 and 17 games against the New England Patriots and Los Angeles Rams, and reverted to the practice squad after each game. His practice squad contract with the team expired after the season on January 11, 2021.

References

External links
 Oklahoma Sooners bio
 Oakland Raiders bio 
 Washington Redskins bio

1990 births
Living people
American football defensive ends
American football defensive tackles
Arizona Cardinals players
Carolina Panthers players
Oakland Raiders players
Oklahoma Sooners football players
Players of American football from Oklahoma
Sportspeople from Muskogee, Oklahoma
Washington Redskins players